Assignment: Murder is a thriller novel by Donald Hamilton.

Plot summary
Dr. James Gregory, a scientist at a secret laboratory in New Mexico, becomes a hunter's prey and his estranged wife is kidnapped.

Publication history
1956, US, Dell, Dell First Edition A123, paperback
1965, US, Fawcett Publications, as Assassins Have Starry Eyes, Gold Medal k1491, paperback

External links
 Review by Hilary Williamson

1956 American novels
American thriller novels
Novels by Donald Hamilton
Novels set in New Mexico